Stéphane Le Bouyonnec (born 26 June 1962) is a Canadian politician. He was member of the National Assembly of Quebec for the riding of La Prairie, first elected in the 2012 election.

His narrow victory over Parti Québécois candidate Pierre Langlois was subject to a judicial recount, which confirmed Le Bouyonnec's victory on 14 September.

In the 2014 election, he was defeated by Liberal Richard Merlini.

On 1 Nov. 2014, he was elected President of the Coalition Avenir Québec, succeeding Maud Cohen. He resigned from the post on 28 August 2018.

References

External links
 

Living people
Coalition Avenir Québec MNAs
People from Falaise, Calvados
Canadian industrial engineers
1962 births
21st-century Canadian politicians